Carlos Prats González (February 24, 1915 – September 30, 1974) was a Chilean Army officer and politician. He served as a minister in Salvador Allende's government while Commander-in-chief of the Chilean Army. Immediately after General Augusto Pinochet's September 11, 1973 coup, Prats went into voluntary exile in Argentina. The following year, he and his wife, Sofía Cuthbert, were assassinated in Buenos Aires by a car bomb planted by the Dirección de Inteligencia Nacional.

Background
Carlos Prats González was born in Talcahuano in 1915, the oldest son of Carlos Prats Risopatrón and Hilda González Suárez. He joined the Army in 1931, and graduated at the top of his class.

In 1935, he was commissioned as an artillery officer. Three years later he became a Sub Lieutenant. Soon he returned to the Military Academy, this time as a teacher. He taught there and at the War Academy until 1954. In 1944, he married Sofia Cuthbert Chiarleoni, with whom he had three daughters.

In 1954, Prats González was promoted to Major, and sent to the military mission in the US, as adjunct military attaché, where he served until 1958. That year he was promoted to Lieutenant Colonel, and returned as teacher to the War Academy. In 1961, he became commander of the Artillery Regiment Nº3 “Chorrillos”, and in 1963, became commander of the Regiment Nº1 “Tacna”.

In 1964, he was promoted to Colonel and sent as military attaché to Argentina. He returned to Chile in 1967 as commander of the III Army Division. In 1968 he was promoted to Brigade General and Chief of the General Staff. The following year he was promoted to Division General.

Public role during the Allende years

Salvador Allende was elected in the 1970 Chilean presidential election. General Prats became the head of the "constitutionalists", all members of the armed forces who supported the Schneider Doctrine. With time, he became the army's strongest supporter of President Allende, and was appointed as a member of his cabinet several times. Allende appointed him as vice-President in 1972 (The Chilean Constitution does not have a standing vice-presidential office; rather, the sitting Minister of the Interior, as the senior cabinet minister, is temporarily designated "vice president" only during the President's absence during formal State visits abroad).

Prats' reputation was significantly damaged in the Alejandrina Cox incident of June 1973, in which he became involved in an altercation with members of the public and fired a shot at their car. He immediately tendered his resignation, but Allende refused to accept it. Days later, an attempted coup known as the Tanquetazo took place; Prats' rapid response helped to defeat the coup and somewhat restored his public standing.

Resignation
On August 22, 1973, the wives of Prats' generals and officers staged a rally in front of his home, calling him a coward for not restoring civil order in Chile. This event convinced Prats that he had lost support of his fellow officers. The next day he resigned his positions, both as Interior minister and as Commander in Chief of the Army. The only two other generals in favor of a constitutional solution to the political crisis, generals Mario Sepulveda Squella and Guillermo Pickering (both in key troop command positions), also presented their resignations in a show of support for him. General Augusto Pinochet, previously second in command and thought to be loyal to Allende, was appointed Commander in Chief of the Army, taking over the position on August 23, 1973. Prats had personally recommended Allende to appoint Pinochet to the position as well.

Prats' retirement removed the last real obstacle to a military coup, which took place three weeks later, on September 11, 1973. Immediately after the coup, on September 15, 1973, Prats voluntarily went into exile with his wife in Argentina.

Assassination 
On September 30, 1974, in Buenos Aires, Prats and his wife Sofia were killed outside their apartment, by a radio-controlled car bomb. Debris reached the ninth-floor balcony of the building across the street. Later, it was learned that the assassination was part of Operation Condor, and planned by members of the Chilean secret police, Dirección de Inteligencia Nacional (DINA). It was committed by the American expatriate and Chilean citizen Michael Townley, who also committed the Orlando Letelier assassination in Washington, DC in 1976.

Legal aftermath and investigations
The former leaders of DINA, including chief Manuel Contreras, ex-chief of operation and retired general Raúl Iturriaga, his brother Roger Iturriaga, and ex-brigadiers Pedro Espinoza and Jose Zara, were charged in 2003 in Chile with Prats' assassination, and were later convicted. The Chilean judge investigating the case, Alejandro Solis, exempted Pinochet from prosecution after the Chilean Supreme court rejected a demand in January 2005 to lift the ex-dictator's immunity .

In Argentina, DINA's civil agent Enrique Arancibia was convicted and sentenced to life imprisonment for Prats' murder. In 2000 SIDE agent Juan Martín Siga Correa was detained by Argentine officials on the orders of federal judge María Servini de Cubría. Martín Siga Correa was DINA's main connection with the SIDE and with Intelligence Battalion 601, and was also a member of the Tacuara Nationalist Movement.

In 2003, Argentine federal judge María Servini de Cubría asked Chile for the extradition of Mariana Callejas, who was Michael Townley's wife, and Cristoph Willikie Fleent, a retired colonel from the Chilean army; the three together were charged with this crime. But Chilean judge Nibaldo Segura from the Appeals court refused extradition in July 2005, arguing that they had already been prosecuted in Chile.

Italian terrorist Stefano Delle Chiaie was reportedly also involved in the murder of Prats. Along with fellow extremist Vincenzo Vinciguerra, Delle Chiaie testified in Rome in December 1995 before Judge Servini that Enrique Arancibia Clavel (a former Chilean secret police agent prosecuted for crimes against humanity in 2004 and Michael Townley were directly involved in this assassination.)

See also
Chile under Allende

References

External links 

United States Army Command and General Staff College
Official biography  
Biography  
The Carlos Prats Assassination
Human rights report on the case
Non-official account of murder  
Chilean agent convicted over Prats' killing
Trial watch
Letter from Allende thanking him after his resignation  

1915 births
1974 deaths
Assassinated Chilean politicians
Chilean Army generals
Chilean Ministers of Defense
Chilean Ministers of the Interior
Chilean people murdered abroad
Chilean people of Catalan descent
Chilean people of Spanish descent
Chilean terrorism victims
Deaths by car bomb
People from Talcahuano
People killed in Operation Condor
People murdered in Argentina
Presidency of Salvador Allende
Terrorism deaths in Argentina
1974 murders in Argentina